The Turin Motor Show was an auto show held annually in Turin, Italy. The first official show took place between 21 and 24 April 1900, at the Castle of Valentino, becoming a permanent fixture in Turin from 1938 having shared it with Milan and Rome until that time. From 1972, the show was held biannually and in 1984, it moved into Fiat's shuttered Lingotto factory. 

In 2000, it was announced that the show was to be moved to April, starting in 2002. However, the event was last held in Turin in June 2000, and cancelled from 2002, resulting in the Bologna Motor Show taking over the role of Italy's International Motor Show. From 2015 to 2019, Turin again held a Motor Show, albeit as an open air festival to keep exhibitors' costs down, and provide free access to the public. It is held in the precinct of the Parco del Valentino.

Major vehicle introductions

1900s

1902
 Adami Rondini

1904
 Motoruota Garavaglia

1906
 Aquila Italiana Cappa

1907
 SPA 28/40HP

1908
 Lancia Alfa-12HP

1910s

1913
 Fiat Zero

1919
 Isotta Fraschini Tipo 8
 Fiat 501 (civilian version)

1920s

1923
 OM 665 "Superba"
 Fiat 519
 Itala 56
 Chiribiri Monza

1925
 Lancia Lambda
 Itala 61
 Alfa Romeo 6C
 Fiat 509

1940s

1947
 Grand Prix racing car prototype designed by Porsche

1948
 Ferrari 166 MM
 Lancia Ardea
 Maserati A6 cabriolet
 Fiat 500 Giardinetta Belvedere

1949
 Porsche-Cisitalia racing cars

1950s

1950
 Lancia Aurelia
 Alfa Romeo 1900
 Fiat 1400

1951
 Panhard Dyna X86 Berlinetta

1952
Abarth 1500 Biposto Coupé
Siata 208 CS

1953

Alfa Romeo BAT 5 concept
 Lancia Appia

1954

The 1954 36th Salone dell'Automobile was inaugurated by Italian President Luigi Einaudi on 21 April and closed on 2 May. The exhibitors were 450 from 11 countries, including 66 car manufacturers and 22 coachbuilders.

Production cars
 Alfa Romeo 1900 Super
 Alfa Romeo Giulietta Sprint
 Fiat 1100 Familiare (estate)
 Fiat 1400 A
 Fiat 1900 A
 Lancia Aurelia series II

Concept cars and prototypes
Alfa Romeo BAT 7 by Bertone
 Fiat Turbina
 Fibreglass-bodied Fiat 8V
 At least 30 vehicle models from different manufacturers designed by Michelotti

1955
 Abarth 207A Spyder
 Abarth 750 Zagato
 Alfa Romeo BAT 9 concept
 Alfa Romeo Giulietta
 Lancia Florida I

1956

Italian President Giovanni Gronchi, escorted by a troop of Corazzieri, inaugurated the 38th Salone Internazionale dell'Automobile on 21 April 1956. The motor show closed on 2 May. The exhibitors were 450 from 13 countries, including 64 car manufacturers, 35 truck and bus manufacturers, and 18 coachbuilders.

Production cars
 Alfa Romeo Giulietta Sprint Veloce
 Fiat 1400 B
 Fiat 1900 B
 Fiat 600 Taxi
 Lancia Flaminia Berlina

Concept cars and prototypes
 Alfa Romeo 2000 Sportiva
 Alfa Romeo Superflow by Pinin Farina
Lancia Appia Cammello

1957

Production cars
 Alfa Romeo 2000 Berlina
 Alfa Romeo Giulietta Sprint Speciale by Bertone
 Alfa Romeo Mille (lorry)
 Fiat 1200 Granluce
Abarth 750 Zagato Spyder
Lancia Appia Convertibile

Concept cars and prototypes
 Lancia Florida II by Pinin Farina
 Ferrari 4.9 Superfast by Pinin Farina (second prototype in the Superfast series that spawned the 1964 Ferrari 500 Superfast)

1958

Production cars 

Abarth 750 GT Bialbero
Lancia Appia GTE
 Lancia Appia Lusso
 Triumph Italia Prototype Design by Michelotti. Built by and shown on the Vignale Stand.

1959

The 1959 41st Salone dell'Automobile was inaugurated by President of the Italian Republic Giovanni Gronchi on 31 October and closed on 11 November.
There were 490 exhibitors from 12 countries, including 65 car manufacturers.

Production cars
Abarth 700S
Fiat Abarth 2200 Coupé and Spider Allemano (Fiat 2100-derived)
 Chrysler Valiant (European première)
Lancia Appia Giardinetta Viotti (station wagon)
 Maserati 5000 GT "Shah of Persia"
Triumph Italia show car Vignale Two cars displayed. One on the Triumph stand and one on the Vignale stand (Italia show car differs slightly from production)

Concept cars and prototypes
 BMW 3200 Michelotti Vignale
 Ghia Selene

1960s

1960
 Pininfarina X concept
 Lancia Flavia

 Triumph Italia (Production version)

1961
 Triumph Italia Shown on the Triumph stand (Production version)

1962
 Alfa Romeo Giulia TZ 1 (Tubolare Zagato)
 Iso Rivolta IR 300

1963

The 1963 45th Salone dell'Automobile was inaugurated by Italian President Antonio Segni on 30 October and closed on 10 November. The exhibitors were 524 from 13 countries, including 72 car manufacturers and 21 coachbuilders.

Production cars
 Autobianchi Stellina (pre-production)
 Iso Grifo
 Lancia Superjolly
 Maserati Quattroporte
 Simca-Abarth 1150

Concept cars and prototypes
 Ghia-Fiat G230S Due Posti (coupé based on the Fiat 2300)
 Daihatsu Sport Vignale (based on the Daihatsu Compagno)
 De Tomaso Vallelunga
 Fiat 2300 S Lausanne (Pininfarina)
Lamborghini 350GTV
 Lancia Flaminia Coupé Speciale (Pininfarina)
 OSI 1200 S Spider (based on the Fiat 1100 D)

1965 

 Dino Berlinetta Speciale
 Fiat Moretti Sportiva

1966
 Fiat 124 Spider
 Fiat 500 Ferves Ranger
 Dino Berlinetta GT concept
Lamborghini Flying Star II concept
Maserati Ghibli (AM115) prototype

1967
The 49th Salone dell'Automobile was held between 1 and 12 November 1967. It saw the presence of 580 exhibitors from 15 countries, including 70 car manufacturers and 13 coachbuilders.

 Alfa Romeo 33 Stradale 
 Lamborghini Marzal concept
 Fiat Dino Coupé

1968

The 50th Salone dell'Automobile was held between 30 October and 10 November 1968; there were 496 exhibitors from 14 countries, including 73 car manufacturers and 13 coachbuilders.

Production cars
 Lancia Fulvia Berlina GTE, Coupé 1.3 S, Sport 1.3 S and Coupé 1.6 HF
 Fiat 124 Special and 125 Special
 Lamborghini Miura S

Concept cars and prototypes
 Autobianchi coupé prototype
Alfa Romeo P33 Roadster Pininfarina
Bandini Saloncino
 Bizzarrini Manta (first work by Italdesign)
 Ferrari P6 Berlinetta Speciale Pininfarina
 Fiat 850 City Taxi
 LMX Sirex (unofficial show exhibit)
 Maserati Simun by Ghia
 Maserati Indy prototype by Vignale

1969

The 51st Salone dell'Automobile was held between 29 October and 9 November 1969; the exhibitors were 550 from 14 countries, including 64 car manufacturers and 14 coachbuilders.

Production cars
 Autobianchi A112
 Alfa Romeo Spider series II
 Alfa Romeo Junior Z
 Fiat 124 Sport Coupé and Sport Spider 1600 (series II)
 Fiat 128 Familiare (3-door station wagon)
 Fiat Dino 2400 Coupé and Spider
 Lancia Fulvia Berlina series II

Concept cars and prototypes
 Alfa Romeo Iguana by Italdesign (33 Stradale-based)
 Autobianchi A112 Runabout by Bertone (roadster with A112 drivetrain)
 Caprera LEM (Fiat 500-based coupé)
 Ferrari 512 S Speciale by Pininfarina
 Fiat 128 Coupé by Bertone
 Fiat 128 coupé and roadster by Moretti
 Fiat 128 Teenager by Pininfarina (beach car)
 Fissore Mongo (Fiat 500-based coupé, design by Aldo Sessano)
 Ikenga GT (designed by David Gittens, coachwork by Charles Williams of Williams & Pritchard)
 Lancia Marica by Ghia (Flaminia-based GT)
Volvo GTZ by Zagato

1970s

1970

The 52nd Salone dell'Automobile was held between 28 October and 8 November 1970; the exhibitors were 540 from 15 countries, including 71 car manufacturers and 14 coachbuilders.

Production cars
 Alfa Romeo Giulia 1300 Super
 De Tomaso Deauville
 Fiat 124 familiare, 124 S and 124 Special T
 Fiat 125 Special
 Lamborghini Urraco
 Lancia Fulvia Berlina series II
 Maserati Ghibli and Maserati Indy series II
 Opel Ascona A

Concept cars and prototypes
 Bertone Shake (dune buggy on a Simca 1200 S chassis)
 Cadillac NART (mid-engined prototype with an Eldorado drivetrain, by Zagato)
 De Tomaso City Car (by Vignale)
Eurostyle Porsche 914
 Hondina Youngstar (Honda N360-based beach car by Zagato)
Lancia Stratos Zero (by Bertone)
 Moretti Dragster (2+2 coupé previewing the Fiat 128 Moretti)
 OTAS A112 KL (A112-based coupé designed by Aldo Sessano, built by Fissore)
Porsche 914/6 Tapiro (by Italdesign)
 Volkswagen 1600 SS (coupé by Francis Lombardi on a VW 1500 chassis)

1971

The 53rd Salone dell'Automobile was held between 3 and 14 November 1971; the exhibitors were 540 from 11 countries, including 64 car manufacturers and 15 coachbuilders.

Production cars
 Alfa Romeo 2000 Berlina with automatic transmission
 Alfa Romeo Alfasud
 Autobianchi A112 Abarth
 Fiat 128 Sport Coupé
 Lancia 2000 Coupé HF

Concept cars and prototypes
Alfa Romeo Caimano by Italdesign
 De Tomaso 1600 Spider by Ghia
 Dunja 1.6 HF by Coggiola
 Ferrari 3Z Spider by Zagato (one-off, 250 California Spyder #2491GT)
 Ferrari Berlinetta Boxer prototype by Pininfarina
 Fiat 127 Coupé by Coriasco
 Fiat 127 Familiare by Coriasco (3-door station wagon)
 Fiat 127 Coupé, saloon and off-roader by Moretti
 Fiat 127 beach car by Savio
 Ford GT70 by Ghia
 Francis Lombardi 127 Lucciola (four-door 127)
 Francis Lombardi Gipsy (Fiat 127-based off-roader)
 NSU Ro80 2+2-door by Pininfarina
 Lancia Stratos HF prototype by Bertone

1972
 Fiat X1/23 "City Car" electric concept
 Fiat 126
Iso Varedo
 Maserati Khamsin concept
 Maserati Boomerang concept by Italdesign
 Lotus Esprit concept
 De Tomaso Longchamp

1974
 Innocenti Mini
 Hyundai Pony
 Fiat 131
 Lamborghini Bravo concept
Maserati Medici I concept
 Porsche 930 Turbo?

1975 

 Alfa Romeo Eagle concept

1976
 Alfa Romeo Alfasud Sprint
 Fiat 126 Cavalletta concept
Innocenti Mini De Tomaso

1977
 Fiat 131
Maserati Merak 2000 GT

1978
 Fiat Ritmo
Lamborghini Faena concept
 Lancia Megagamma concept
Lancia Sibilo concept

1980s

1980
 Ferrari Pinin concept
 Lancia Beta Trevi
Lancia Medusa concept

1982
Italdesign Orca concept
Lancia Rally 037
 Lancia Delta Turbo 4x4
Ferrari 208 GTB Turbo

1984
 Alfa Romeo 90
 Lancia Thema
Maserati Biturbo Spyder

1986
 Alfa Romeo Vivace concept (previewing the design of the 164 saloon of 1987 and the 916 series GTV and Spider of 1993)
 Citroën Zabrus concept
 Italdesign Machimoto concept
 Lancia Delta HF 4WD
 Lancia Prisma (second series, including 4WD variant)
 Lancia Thema 8.32
 Lamborghini LM002
Maserati 228

1988

Production cars
 Fiat Croma Turbo D i.d. (first production diesel direct injection engine)
 Maserati 222

Concept cars and prototypes
 Bertone Genesis
 Italdesign Asgard
 Italdesign Aspid
 Italdesign Aztec
 Lancia ECV 2 experimental racing car
 Pininfarina HIT

1990–2000

1990
This 63rd Turin Motor Show coincided with Italy hosting the 1990 FIFA World Cup (Italia 90) hence the presentation by Fiat of limited edition models related to that international event.

Production cars

Concept cars and prototypes
 Bertone Nivola
 Ghia Zig
 Ghia Zag
Jaguar Kensington by Italdesign Giugiaro (design later adapted for the Daewoo Leganza)
 SEAT Proto TL by Italdesign Giugiaro
 Bugatti ID 90 by Italdesign Giugiaro

1992 
Production cars

 Maserati Ghibli (AM336)

Concept cars and prototypes

1994

Production cars
 Alfa Romeo 145
 Maserati Quattroporte (fourth generation)
 Nissan Micra Cabriolet

Concept cars and prototypes

1996
 Fiat Barchetta Coupé by Maggiora

1998
The 67th Turin Motor Show was held from 24 April to 3 May.

Production cars
 Fiat Multipla

Concept cars and prototypes
 Alfa Romeo Dardo by Pininfarina
Covini C36
 Lancia Diàlogos
Stola Abarth Monotipo

2000
The 68th Turin Motor Show held in June 2000 was the last edition, as in 2002, the event was cancelled and never held again. The change in date was to avoid clashing with the Geneva Motor Show. The show first requested for a June date in March 1998.

Production cars
 Alfa Romeo 147

Concept cars and prototypes
Ferrari Rossa by Pininfarina
 Ford Streetka Concept

2015–2019

2015
From 2015, the Turin Motor Show returned, however no longer based on a large and costly static exhibition format. Instead, it became a free public festival, held at the historical Parco del Valentino, and featured demonstrations along the route used for various motorsport grands prix between 1935 and 1954.

Production cars
 Alfa Romeo 4C
 Alfa Romeo 4C Spider
 Alfa Romeo Giulietta
 Alfa Romeo Mito
 Audi R8
 BMW M3
 Ferrari 488 GTB
 Ferrari California T
 Fiat 500 vintage '57
 Lamborghini Aventador SV 
 Lamborghini Huracán
 Maserati Quattroporte
 Maserati Ghibli
 Mercedes-Benz Mercedes-AMG GT
 Pagani Zonda Revolución
 Porsche 911 GT3
 Porsche Cayman GT4

Concept cars and prototypes
 Ferrari FXX-K (13)
 Italdesign Giugiaro Gea
 Pininfarina Sergio
 Pininfarina Cambiano
  Umberto Palermo Design Mole Costruzione artigianale modello 001
  Umberto Palermo Design Lucrezia
  Umberto Palermo Design Vittoria

2016

Production cars
 Abarth 595
 Alfa Romeo Giulia
 Ferrari GTC4Lusso
 Fiat 500 S
 Pagani Huayra BC

Concept cars and prototypes
 Mazzanti Evantra Millecavalli
 Mole Valentino
 Frangivento Asfanè 
 Model 5 Genesi
 Mole Luce

2017

Production cars
 Abarth 695 XSR
 Abarth 124 Spider
 Alpine A110
 Fiat 500L Cross
 Fiat Fullback Cross
 Fiat 500 60th 
 Jeep Compass
 Jeep Wrangler
 Alfa Romeo Giulia
 Alfa Romeo Stelvio
 Maserati Levante
 Maserati Ghibli
 Ferrari 488 Spider special green (25)
 Ferrari GTC4LussoT
 BMW 4 Series Cabrio
 BMW 4 Series Gran Coupé ICONIC 4 EDITION
 BMW M4 CS

Concept cars and prototypes
 Fittipaldi EF7 Vision Gran Turismo by Pininfarina.
 Lancia ZERO37 4WD Hybrid Politecnico di Torino
 Italdesign Zerouno

2018

Production cars
 Aston Martin DB11
 BMW i8 Roadster
 Ferrari Portofino
 Ferrari 488 Pista
 Ferrari GTC4Lusso

Concept cars and prototypes
Umberto Palermo Alfa Romeo 4C Mole Costruzione Artigianale 001

2019

Production cars
 Abarth 595 Esseesse
 Abarth 124 Spider Rally 2019
 Alfa Romeo Stelvio Ti
 Ferrari SF90 Stradale
 Jeep Renegade Hybrid Plug-in
 Peugeot 508 SW HYbrid

Concept cars and prototypes
 Alfa Romeo Tonale
 Alfa Romeo Giulia Quadrifoglio Ocra
 Fiat Centoventi
 Nissan Leaf Nismo Rc
 Mole Costruzione Artigianale Almas

2020
The following vehicles were to be presented at the show in 2020: 
 Alfa Romeo Giulia (upgrade)
 Alfa Romeo Giulia GTA
 Alfa Romeo Giulia GTAm
 Alfa Romeo Stelvio (upgrade)
 Ferrari Roma
Cancelled and transferred to Milan.

2022

References

Auto shows in Italy
1900 establishments in Italy
Recurring events established in 1900
Events in Turin